Georges Bonnet (9 June 1919 – 22 February 2021) was a French writer and poet.

Biography
Born in 1919 in Pons, Bonnet first worked as a physical education teacher and did not publish his first book until the age of 45 and his second at the age of 64. He lived in Poitiers during his writing career, where he published his most successful novel, Les yeux des chiens ont toujours soif. He published his final book at the age of 97, titled Juste avant la nuit.

A road in Poitiers was named after him. Georges Bonnet died on 22 February 2021 at the age of 101.

Works
La tête en ses jardins (1965)
Le veilleur de javelles (1983)
Aux mamelles du silence (1986)
Une mort légère (1988)
Les belles rondeurs de l'évidence (1989)
Ce qui toujours s'approche (1991)
De quoi en faire un monde (1992)
Dans une autre saison (1993)
Patience des jours (1994)
Tout bien pesé (1996)
Entre temps (1997)
Remontée vers le jour (1999)
Un si bel été (2000)
Coquerets et coquerelles (2003)
Un seul moment (2004)
Un bref moment de bonheur (2004)
Lointains (2005)
Un ciel à hauteur d'homme (2006)
Les yeux des chiens ont toujours soif (2006)
Un jour nous partirons (2008)
Chaque regard est un adieu (2010)
Entre deux mots la nuit (2012)
La claudication des jours (2013)
Derrière un rideau d'ombres (2014)
Juste avant la nuit (2016)

References

1919 births
2021 deaths
French centenarians
People from Poitiers
French male poets
French male novelists
People from Charente-Maritime
20th-century French poets
20th-century French novelists
20th-century French male writers
21st-century French poets
21st-century French novelists
21st-century French male writers
Men centenarians